Caloptilia illicii is a moth of the family Gracillariidae. It is known from the islands of Honshū, Kyūshū and Shikoku in Japan.

The wingspan is 15-16.5 mm.

The larvae feed on Illicium religiosum and Illicium tashiroi. They probably mine the leaves of their host plant.

References

illicii
Moths of Japan
Moths described in 1966